Lerby Eliandry Pong Babu (born 21 November 1991) is an Indonesian professional footballer who plays as a striker for Liga 1 club Bali United.

Club career

Bali United
Lerby started his career in 2015 Indonesia Super League with a good record. He made three goals in two games, and he managed to equal his total goal scores in last season. Lerby scored all three goals for Bali United against Perseru Serui and Persipura Jayapura.

Borneo FC
Lerby joined in early 2016. and made his debut in the 2016 East Kalimantan Governor Cup and 2016 Indonesia Soccer Championship A. Lerby scored his debut in the seventh week against Persegres Gresik United. He coming as a substitute.

Return to Bali United
On 5 January 2020, it was confirmed that Lerby would re-join Bali United, signing a year contract. He made his league debut on 1 March 2020 in a match against Persita Tangerang. On 6 March 2020, Lerby scored his first goal for Bali United against Barito Putera in the 66th minute. This season was suspended on 27 March 2020 due to the COVID-19 pandemic. The season was abandoned and was declared void on 20 January 2021.

International career
He made his debut for the Indonesia national football team in the 2016 AFF Championship against Thailand on 19 November 2016. and made his first international goals against Thailand national team. Just two minutes later Indonesia strike again and stun the Thais when Lerby Eliandry nods the balls into the back of the net after a cross from Beny Wahyudi.

Career statistics

Club

International

International goals
Scores and results list Indonesia's goal tally first.

Personal life
Eliandry is a devout Protestant Christian who routinely listens to religious Christian music before games, a fact that he keeps private from his Muslim teammates and coaches. Eliandry is an ethnic Toraja and is married to  Risma Syahrozad, whom he wed on 22 May 2017.

Honours

Club
Persisam Putra Samarinda U-21
 Indonesia Super League U-21 runner-up: 2012
Borneo
 Indonesia President's Cup runner-up: 2017
Bali United
 Liga 1: 2021–22

International 
Indonesia
AFF Championship runner-up: 2016

References

External links
 
 

1991 births
Living people
Indonesian footballers
Liga 1 (Indonesia) players
Persisam Putra Samarinda players
Bali United F.C. players
Borneo F.C. players
Sportspeople from East Kalimantan
People from Samarinda
Indonesian Protestants
Torajan people
Indonesia international footballers
Indonesia youth international footballers
Association football forwards